Yemi Adesanya is a Nigerian author, accountant and inventor. She is the co-founder of The Arts & Civics Table (TACT). Her first collection of poetry is titled Musings of a Tangled Tongue.

Early life and education 
Born Jolaoyemi Doyinsola Olatubosun to a family of eight, Adesanya attended schools in Ibadan, Oyo State, and Akungba, Ondo State of Nigeria.

Poetry collection 
Adesanya's debut poetry collection titled Musings of a Tangled Tongue was published in 2016 by Kiibaati Resources Limited to rave reviews. It contains 54 poems over sixty pages.

The collection has been described as "a debut publication that invites readers on a poetic journey paved with goofiness, love dealings and dilemma, child-rearing and childhood, supplication, existential musings, corporate chaos, mischiefs and misadventures, and outright naughtiness." and also as "witty, it's irreverent, it's relatable, and most importantly, it is refreshing."

Card game invention 
In 2014, Yemi invented two card games. One was called The Game of Giants, designed "to teach history in a fun and interactive way"

. She has also suggested new informal holidays in Nigeria.

References

External links 
 "Yẹmí Adésànyà's website"
 "The Nigerian Satire Festival"
 "Troll Cabal Website"
 "TACT Nigeria"

Living people
Yoruba poets
21st-century Nigerian poets
Writers from Ibadan
English-language writers from Nigeria
21st-century Nigerian women writers
Yoruba women writers
Nigerian women poets
Olatubosun Oladapo family
Year of birth missing (living people)